Juan Carlos Sánchez Frías (born 1 September 1956 in Formosa, Argentina) is a former Argentine-Bolivian football striker who played most of his career in the Bolivian League.

Sánchez started his career with Argentine club Gimnasia y Esgrima de Jujuy in 1972. By 1979, he moved to Bolivia to play for Guabirá, where in 1980 he became the top-scorer in the Bolivian league for the first time by netting 21 goals; his scoring ability bought him a transfer to Blooming, where he spent the best years of his professional career. Playing for Blooming, he scored 136 goals in five seasons, including the league top-scorer in 1981 and 1983.

In 1984, Sánchez helped Blooming win the Bolivian title, and in 1985 he became the Copa Libertadores topscorer with 11 goals, 6 of which came in an 8–0 victory over Deportivo Italia, which set a Copa Libertadores record.

In 1986, he joined Jorge Wilstermann, but then returned to Blooming in 1987.

Sánchez also had a spell with Deportivo Litoral before joining San José in 1990, where he became topscorer in the Bolivian league for the fourth time in his career.

In 1991, he joined Independiente Petrolero, and then returned to San José to retire at the end of the 1992 season. He scored a total of 263 goals during his professional career, becoming the second all-time top-scorer in Bolivian League history.

Moreover, Sánchez played a total of 53 Copa Libertadores games during his career, scoring 26 goals, which puts him in 8th place in the list of all-time scorers for that competition.

He played five matches for Bolivia in 1985 scoring one goal, versus Brazil.

Club titles

Honours

After retirement

After retirement Sánchez has gone on to coach and manage several teams, he was a coach at Guabirá, assistant manager at Blooming and he has served as the manager of the Bolivia under-17 and under-20 teams. He currently resides in Montero, Bolivia where he runs his own youth football academy.

References

External links
Conmebol.com profile 
Copa Libertadores topscorers

1956 births
Living people
People from Formosa, Argentina
Argentine footballers
Bolivian footballers
Bolivia international footballers
Association football forwards
Gimnasia y Esgrima de Jujuy footballers
Club Blooming players
Guabirá players
Club Deportivo Litoral (Cochabamba) players
C.D. Jorge Wilstermann players
Club San José players
Bolivian Primera División players
Expatriate footballers in Bolivia
Argentine football managers
Bolivian football managers
Argentine emigrants to Bolivia
Naturalized citizens of Bolivia